Sandar Min (also spelt Sanda Min; born 5 November 1968) is a Burmese politician and former political prisoner who currently serves as a Yangon Region Hluttaw MP for Seikkyi Kanaungto Township № 1 constituency. She previously served as a House of Representatives MP for Zabuthiri Township constituency.

Early life and education
Sandar was born on 5 November 1968 in Rangoon, Myanmar. She graduated with B.Sc. (Chemistry) from Rangoon Arts and Sciences University.

Political career
Sandar Min first became involved in politics during the 1988 uprisings. At the time, she was studying chemistry and joined thousands of students who took to the streets demanding an end to military rule. She was part of the "Tri-Color" student group, which coordinated the student movement and acted as security for democracy icon and NLD leader Aung San Suu Kyi. As a result, Sandar Min was arrested and sent to prison. She was released on 13 January 2012, as part of a national amnesty, after spending 5 years in jail, after protesting fuel price hikes with the 88 Generation Students Group in 2007. Sanda Min has spent several stints in prison for her political work: 1989 to 1992, 1996, and 2007 to 2012.

Sandar became a member of the National League for Democracy. In the 2012 Burmese by-elections, she contested the Zabuthiri Township constituency for a seat in the Pyithu Hluttaw, the country's lower house, and won the seat that Thein Sein vacated in 2011 to become President of Burma.

In the 2015 Myanmar general election, she was elected as a Yangon Region Hluttaw representative from Seikkyi Kanaungto Township № 1 parliamentary constituency. She is the heads of regional parliament's Finance, Planning and Economic Committee. She accused her colleagues in the region government of jeopardizing economic growth and
putting thousands of labourers out of work, after they suspended construction at all projects with nine floors or more.

References

External links

Members of Pyithu Hluttaw
National League for Democracy politicians
People from Yangon
Prisoners and detainees of Myanmar
1968 births
Living people
University of Yangon alumni
21st-century Burmese women politicians
21st-century Burmese politicians